Joseph T. Rucker (January 1, 1887 – October 21, 1957) was an American cinematographer who won the Academy Award along with Willard Van der Veer at the 3rd Academy Awards in 1930 for Best Cinematography for the film With Byrd at the South Pole.  He and Van der Veer won their Oscars for camera work for Admiral Byrd's 1928 and 1930 expeditions to Antarctica. In the latter expedition, he and Van der Veer brought back over 160,000 feet of raw footage.

He spent 40 years of his life as a news cameraman at Paramount News and at NBC. In addition to the Byrd expeditions, he is remembered for filming the 1914 opening of the Panama Canal, the aftermath of the 1923 Tokyo earthquake, the 1927 Chinese Civil War, and WWII's Pacific conflict from the USS Enterprise (CV-6).

The Rucker Spur in Antarctica was named after him by the Advisory Committee on Antarctic Names.

Selected filmography
With Byrd at the South Pole (1930)

References

External links
 
 

1887 births
1957 deaths
Best Cinematographer Academy Award winners
American cinematographers
Artists from Atlanta